Solar Eagle may refer to:
 Boeing SolarEagle, a solar/electric-powered unmanned aerial vehicle
 Solar Eagle, a series of solar cars developed by the Cal State LA Solar Car Team